Roger Federer defeated Andy Roddick in the final, 5–7, 7–6(8–6), 7–6(7–5), 3–6, 16–14 to win the gentlemen's singles tennis title at the 2009 Wimbledon Championships. It was his sixth Wimbledon title and record-breaking 15th major title overall, passing Pete Sampras' all-time record. It was the longest men's singles major final (in terms of games played) in history with 77 games, breaking the record of 71 games set at the 1927 Australian Open. The match also had the longest fifth set (16–14) in a major men's singles final, surpassing the 11–9 fifth set in the 1927 French Open final. The match took 4 hours and 17 minutes to complete, and the fifth set alone lasted 95 minutes. It was a repeat of the 2004 and 2005 finals, where Federer also beat Roddick to win the title. This was Federer's 11th grass-court title, surpassing the previous record held by Sampras (10). Notably, Roddick lost despite only having his serve broken once, in the last game of the match. By winning the title, Federer regained the world No. 1 singles ranking.

Rafael Nadal was the defending champion, but withdrew from the tournament due to knee tendinitis.

Roddick's run to the final would be the last time where an American male player reached the finals of a major as of 2022.

This was the first major appearance of future ATP Finals champion Grigor Dimitrov, who retired in the first round against Igor Kunitsyn.

Seeds

  Rafael Nadal (withdrew)
  Roger Federer (champion)
  Andy Murray (semifinals)
  Novak Djokovic (quarterfinals)
  Juan Martín del Potro (second round)
  Andy Roddick (final)
  Fernando Verdasco (fourth round)
  Gilles Simon (fourth round)
  Jo-Wilfried Tsonga (third round)
  Fernando González (third round)
  Marin Čilić (third round)
  Nikolay Davydenko (third round)
  Robin Söderling (fourth round)
  Marat Safin (first round)
  Tommy Robredo (third round)
  David Ferrer (third round)
  James Blake (first round)
  Rainer Schüttler (second round)
  Stan Wawrinka (fourth round)
  Tomáš Berdych (fourth round)
  Feliciano López (first round)
  Ivo Karlović (quarterfinals)
  Radek Štěpánek (fourth round)
  Tommy Haas (semifinals)
  Dmitry Tursunov (first round)
  Jürgen Melzer (third round)
  Philipp Kohlschreiber (third round)
  Mardy Fish (third round)
  Igor Andreev (fourth round)
  Viktor Troicki (third round)
  Victor Hănescu (third round)
  Albert Montañés (third round)
  Nicolas Kiefer (first round)

Qualifying

Draw

Finals

Top half

Section 1

Section 2

Section 3

Section 4

Bottom half

Section 5

Section 6

Section 7

Section 8

References

External links

 2009 Wimbledon Championships – Men's draws and results at the International Tennis Federation

Men's Singles
Wimbledon Championship by year – Men's singles